Asalto a la ciudad (English language: Assault on the City) is a 1968  Argentine black and white crime film directed and written by Carlos Cores who also starred with Santiago Gómez Cou and Olga Zubarry. The film premiered on 3 March 1968 in Buenos Aires. The film is based upon a crime novel.

Cast
 Agustín Barrios
 Guillermo Battaglia
 Osvaldo Brandi ....  Empleado de inmobiliaria
 Pedro Buchardo
 José Comellas
 Carlos Cores ....  Antonio
 Silvia del Río ....  Singer
 Thelma del Río
 Roberto Germán
 Santiago Gómez Cou...as himself
 Saul Jarlip
 Elizabeth Killian ....  Antonio's Wife
 Aída Luz ....  Julian's Mother
 Sergio Malbrán
 Susana Mayo
 Juan José Miguez ....  Rodolfo
 Inés Murray
 Juan Carlos Palma
 Nathán Pinzón
 Ignacio Quirós ....  Julian
 Sergio Renán ....  Ernesto
 Raúl Ricutti ....  Pasajero en colectivo
 Joe Rígoli
 Semillita ....  Pasajero en colectivo
 Luis Tasca ....  Nicolas
 Olga Zubarry ....  Nicolas's Wife

External links
 

1968 films
1960s Spanish-language films
1968 crime films
Argentine black-and-white films
Argentine crime films
1960s Argentine films